The Men's 50 kilometres walk at the 1952 Summer Olympics took place on July 21 at the Helsinki Olympic Stadium. Italian athlete Giuseppe Dordoni earned the gold medal and set a new Olympic Record.

Results

References

External links
Official Olympic Report, la84.org.

Athletics at the 1952 Summer Olympics
Racewalking at the Olympics
Men's events at the 1952 Summer Olympics